Marcel Russenberger (born 5 September 1958) is a Swiss former professional racing cyclist. He rode in three editions of the Tour de France and the 1984 Giro d'Italia.

Major results
1982
 9th Overall Tirreno–Adriatico
 10th Milano–Torino
 10th Grand Prix d'Ouverture La Marseillaise
1983
 6th Coppa Bernocchi
 8th Milano–Torino
1985
 2nd Ziklokross Igorre

Grand Tour general classification results timeline

References

External links
 

1958 births
Living people
Swiss male cyclists
Sportspeople from the canton of Schaffhausen